Green Van is a 1959 Soviet action film directed by Genrikh Gabay.

Plot 
The film takes place in 1920. The Red Army enters Odessa and is trying to clear it of crime. The Chekists hope that the workers and peasants youth will help them in this.

Cast 
 Roman Filippov as Fedka Byk
 Dmitri Ivanov
 Vladimir Kolokoltsev as Volodya Kozachenko
 Konstantin Kulchitsky as owner of wagon
 Olga Lysenko as Marusya Tsymbalyuk
 Igor Maksimov
 Dmitri Milyutenko as grandfather Taras
 Viktor Mizinenko as Viktor Prokofievich Shestakov
 Stanislava Shimanskaya as Selyanka
 Yuri Timoshenko as Grishchenko

References

External links 
 

1959 films
1950s Russian-language films
Soviet action drama films
1956 drama films
1956 films
Soviet black-and-white films
1950s action films